Todd Haynes is an American filmmaker

Haynes is known for directing such films as Velvet Goldmine (1998), Far from Heaven (2002), I'm Not There (2007), Carol (2015) and Wonderstruck (2017).

He has received nominations from the Academy Awards, British Academy Film Awards, Golden Globe Awards, and Independent Spirit Awards for his film work. He also received three Primetime Emmy Award nominations for his HBO limited series Mildred Pierce (2011)

His films have also premiered and competed at the Berlin International Film Festival, Cannes Film Festival, Sundance Film Festival, and Venice International Film Festival.

Major associations

Academy Awards

British Academy Film Awards

Golden Globe Awards

Independent Spirit Award

Primetime Emmy Awards

Festival awards

Berlin Film Festival

Cannes Film Festival

Sundance Film Festival

Venice Film Festival

Critics awards

References 

Lists of awards received by film director